Helmanis is a Latvian surname of German origin (from German surname Hellmann). Notable people with the surname include:

Egils Helmanis (born 1971), Latvian politician
Kristaps Helmanis (1848–1892), Latvian vaccinologist and microbiologist
Uvis Helmanis (born 1972), Latvian basketball player

Latvian-language masculine surnames